Charles Lawrence Robinson (July 21, 1818 – August 17, 1894) was an American politician who served in the California State Assembly from 1851-52, and later as the first Governor of Kansas from 1861 until 1863.  He was also the first governor of a US state to be impeached by a state legislature, although he was found not guilty during subsequent State Senate impeachment trial and was not removed from office. After his time as governor he served in the Kansas Senate from 1873 to 1881. To date, he is the only governor of Kansas to be impeached.

Biography

Massachusetts
Robinson was educated at Hadley and Amherst academies, and at Amherst College. He studied medicine in Woodstock, Vermont, and later in Pittsfield, Massachusetts, where he earned his medical degree at the Berkshire Medical College in 1843.  He practiced medicine in Belchertown,  Springfield, and Fitchburg.

California
In 1849, he traveled overland to California. He edited a daily paper in Sacramento called the Settler's and Miner's Tribune in 1850, took an active part in the riots of 1850 as an upholder of squatter sovereignty, was seriously wounded, and, while under indictment for conspiracy and murder, was elected to the California legislature. He was subsequently discharged by the court without trial. He represented California's 12th State Assembly district from 1851 to 1852.

He married Sara Tappen Doolittle Lawrence in 1851, and they had two children. She later published Kansas, its Exterior and Interior Life (Boston, 1856), in which she describes the scenes, actors, and events of the struggle between the friends and foes of slavery in Kansas. In 1852, Charles returned to Massachusetts, and conducted in Fitchburg a weekly paper called the News.

Kansas

In 1854, Robinson happened to attend a meeting at which Eli Thayer of the New England Emigrant Aid Society spoke about the need to oppose slavery. After the speech, the two were introduced to one another. Thayer took an immediate liking to Robinson and asked him to act as the New England Emigrant Aid Company's official financial agent, to which Robinson agreed. In June of that year, Robinson went to Kansas Territory with Charles Branscomb to find suitable land upon which the Emigrant Aid Society could found a town dedicated to the free state cause. Robinson's efforts eventually led to the founding of Lawrence.

During the tragic Bleeding Kansas period, Robinson angered many with his passionate support for the Free-Staters, who were promoting a fight against pro-slavery advocates. He was illegally elected Territorial Governor of Kansas under the Topeka Constitution in January 1856. From the spring of 1856 until September, Robinson and several other Free-State leaders, including John Brown, Jr., the son of abolitionist John Brown, were held in custody in Camp Sackett.

Impeachment
In 1861, Robinson took office as governor of the newly admitted State of Kansas and served one term from February 9, 1861, to January 12, 1863. In 1861, the Kansas House of Representatives impeached him along with Secretary of State J. W. Robinson and State Auditor George S. Hillyer for alleged mishandling of bond sale to fund the raising of troops in support of the Union cause. Robinson was found not guilty in his impeachment trial before the State Senate, but it hurt his political career; both Robinson and Hillyer were found guilty and removed from office.

Robinson's impeachment resulted from a political rivalry with James H. Lane, the first U.S. Senator from Kansas.

Later life 
Elected to the Kansas State Senate, Robinson served from 1873 to 1881. He served as president of the Kansas Historical Society from 1879 to 1880. Later, he became a Superintendent of the Haskell Institute and served from 1887 to 1889, and was regent of the University of Kansas for twelve years.

Robinson died on August 17, 1894, and is buried in Oak Hill Cemetery in Lawrence.

References

External links

Kansas State Historical Society
Impeachment of State Officials
Publications concerning Kansas Governor Robinson's administration available via the KGI Online Library

National Governors Association
The Political Graveyard

|-

|-

|-

1818 births
1894 deaths
19th-century American politicians
19th-century Christian universalists
Amherst College alumni
Berkshire Medical College alumni
Bleeding Kansas
California Whigs
Governors of Kansas
Kansas Republicans
Kansas state senators
Members of the California State Assembly
Members of the Universalist Church of America
People from Hardwick, Massachusetts
Republican Party governors of Kansas
Union (American Civil War) state governors
Impeached state and territorial governors of the United States